Ond Chance Kodi is a 2015 Kannada-language comedy film Produced by Dr Sunilkumar R M directed by Sathyamitra. The film stars Ravishankar Gowda, Patre Ajith, debutante Linto and Shruti. The film was a remake of Malayalam film Best of Luck (2010) which was loosely based on the Hindi film All The Best (2009) which was an adaptation of the Marathi play Pati Sagle Uchapati which in turn was based on the English comedy play Right Bed Wrong Husband. While the Marathi play was adapted into Kannada earlier as Housefull, the Tamil adaptation of the English play titled Thikku Theriyatha Veettil was made into a Tamil movie Veettuku Veedu which was remade in Kannada earlier as Galate Samsara - thus making this the third Kannada on-screen adaptation of the original play.

Ond Chance Kodi features music by Mysore Gopi. The film was launched on 20 August 2013 in Bangalore and commenced filming that same month. The film was shot in Chikmagalur, Goa and Wayanad.

Cast 
 Ravishankar Gowda as Nakula 
 Patre Ajth as Shukla 
 Linto as Nithya
 Shruti as Tavare 
 B. C. Patil as Vinayaka Patil
 Dr. Nandini 
 Tennis Krishna
 Sadhu Kokila
 M. S. Umesh
 Mandeep Roy
 Honnavalli Krishna

Soundtrack

Release 
The Times of India gave the film two-and-a-half out of five stars and wrote that "Though sprinkled with humour, this remake of Malayalam movie Best of Luck fails to impress as the script is weak".

References 

2015 films
2010s Kannada-language films
Indian comedy films
Kannada remakes of Malayalam films
2015 comedy films